The following lists events that happened during 2007 in Brunei.

Events

February
 February 12 - A tri-nation deal has been signed to protect 200,000 square kilometres of rainforest on the island of Borneo. Malaysia, Indonesia and Brunei pledged to protect the area, known as the "Heart of Borneo". It is considered one of the most important sites of biodiversity in the world, home to thousands of species.

References

 
Years of the 21st century in Brunei
2000s in Brunei
Brunei
Brunei